Bradley Game (born 8 November 1995) is an Australian male BMX rider, representing his nation at international competitions. He competed in the time trial event at the 2015 UCI BMX World Championships.

References

External links
 
 

1995 births
Living people
BMX riders
Australian male cyclists
Place of birth missing (living people)